The discography of Augie March, an Australian indie rock band, formed in 1996, consists of seven studio albums, three extended plays and sixteen singles.

Albums

Studio albums

Video albums

Extended plays

Singles

References

Discographies of Australian artists